Cove Rangers Football Club, a senior association football club based in Cove Bay, Aberdeen, Scotland, was founded in 1922. Cove originally played in the Aberdeen Juvenile League before becoming original member of the Aberdeenshire Amateur Football Association in 1947. In 1985 the club became a junior team, and then successfully applied to join the senior Highland Football League in 1986, the joint-highest tier of non-league football in Scotland, along with the Lowland Football League, and joint-fifth tier overall in the Scottish football league system. They spent 33 consecutive seasons in the Highland League, winning the competition seven times.

The 2014–15 season saw the introduction of a play-off competition where the champions of the Highland and Lowland Leagues would play each other and the winner plays the club that finished in last place of Scottish League Two, the fourth tier of the Scottish Professional Football League, for a chance to take their place for the following season. If the League Two club wins they retain their league status. All play-off matches are two-legged ties. Cove Rangers first entered the play-offs when they won the 2015–16 Highland Football League, they lost to the Lowland League champions Edinburgh City 4–1 on aggregate in the semi-final. Their next chance at promotion was in the 2017–18 season, they beat The Spartans in the semi-final but lost 3–1 on aggregate to League Two side Cowdenbeath. They won the play-offs in their third attempt after winning the 2018–19 Highland Football League, they beat East Kilbride in the semi-final and Berwick Rangers in the final with a 7–0 aggregate win, earning promotion to the 2019–20 Scottish League Two.

The club's first season in a professional league was a successful one, they played 28 games, won 22, drew two and lost four. The season was suspended on the 13 March 2020 due to the COVID-19 pandemic, and curtailed on the 15 April with the points per game earned by each team to date used to determine the final standings, which resulted in the club finishing in first place, therefore winning the League Two title and earning a second consecutive promotion to League One.

Cove qualified to enter the Scottish Cup nine times before becoming full members of the Scottish Football Association and qualifying automatically each season from 2007–08. Their best run in the cup was reaching the fifth round in the 2017–18 season. After their promotion to League Two in 2019 the club was eligible to participate in the League Cup and Challenge Cup, being eliminated in the group stage and third round respectively.

As at the end of 2020–21, the club's first team had spent 2 seasons in the SPFL and 33 in non-League football (North Junior League and Highland League). The table details their achievements in first-team competitions for each completed season since their first appearance in the Junior League in 1985–86. This list does not include their seasons in local amateur leagues before 1985.

Key

Key to divisions
 Aberdeenshire Amateur League = Aberdeenshire Amateur Football Association League Division One
 North Junior League East Two = North Junior Football League East Section Division Two
 Highland League = Highland Football League
 SPFL League One = Scottish League One
 SPFL League Two = Scottish League Two

Key to positions and symbols
  = Champions
  = Runners-up
  = Promoted

Key to rounds
Group = Group stage
R1 = First round, etc.
— = Did not enter or qualify for the competition
N/A = Not eligible to enter the competition

Seasons

Notes

References

Seasons
Cove Rangers